Marsico may refer to two Italian municipalities:

Marsico Nuovo, in the Province of Potenza (Basilicata)
Marsicovetere, in the Province of Potenza (Basilicata)

See also
Marsica, geographical region of Abruzzo (Italy)